Miguel Casiri (Mikhael Ghaziri)
(1710–1791) was a learned Maronite and Orientalist. He was born in Tripoli, Lebanon (formerly in Ottoman Syria). He studied at Rome, where he lectured on Arabic, Syriac, Aramaic, philosophy and theology. In 1748 he went to Spain and was employed in the royal library at Madrid. He was successively appointed a member of the Royal Academy of History, interpreter of oriental languages to the king, and joint-librarian at the Escorial. In 1763 he became principal librarian, a post which he appears to have held till his death in 1791.

Casiri published a work entitled Bibliotheca Arabico-Hispana Escurialensis (2 vols., Madrid, 1760–1770). It is a catalogue of more than 1800 Arabic manuscripts, which he found in the library of the Escorial; it also contains a number of quotations from Arabic works on history. The manuscripts are classified according to subjects. The second volume gives an account of a large collection of geographical and historical manuscripts, which contain valuable information regarding the wars between the Moors and the Christians in Spain. Casiri's work is not yet obsolete, but a more scientific system is adopted in Hartwig Derenbourg's incomplete treatise, Les Manuscrits arabes de l'Escorial (Paris, 1884).

References

18th-century writers from the Ottoman Empire
1710 births
1791 deaths
Arabic–Latin translators
Arabic–Spanish translators
Spanish librarians
Spanish philologists
Spanish lexicographers
Spanish translators
Lebanese librarians
Lebanese philologists
Lebanese lexicographers
Lebanese translators
Maronites from the Ottoman Empire
People from Tripoli, Lebanon
Spanish people of Lebanese descent
Spanish Maronites
Scholars of Al-Andalus history
18th-century translators
18th-century lexicographers